The 2014 World Mixed Doubles Curling Championship were held from April 23 to 30 at the Dumfries Ice Bowl in Dumfries, Scotland.  The event was held in conjunction with the 2014 World Senior Curling Championships.

Switzerland continued their dominance of the championship with a fifth title win by cousins Michelle and Reto Gribi over Sweden's Per Noreen and Camilla Johansson, who won their second silver medal as a pair and third consecutive silver medal for Sweden. Switzerland won with a score of 8–6. Spain's Irantzu Garcia and Sergio Vez won the first World Curling medal for Spain in the bronze medal game with a 7–4 win over defending champions Dorottya Palansca and Zsolt Kiss of Hungary.

Canada, Norway, and England scored perfect ends in their games in Draws 5, 11, and 22, respectively.

Teams
The teams are listed as follows:

Round-robin standings
Final round-robin standings

Round-robin results

Group A

Thursday, April 24
Draw 1
8:15

Draw 4
19:30

Friday, April 25
Draw 6
11:15

Draw 9
21:00

Saturday, April 26
Draw 12
14:30

Sunday, April 27
Draw 15
8:00

Draw 18
17:45

Draw 19
21:00

Monday, April 28
Draw 21
11:15

Draw 22
14:30

Tuesday, April 29
Draw 25
8:00

Group B

Thursday, April 24
Draw 2
12:00

Friday, April 25
Draw 5
8:00

Draw 8
17:45

Saturday, April 26
Draw 11
11:15

Draw 14
21:00

Sunday, April 27
Draw 16
11:15

Draw 17
14:30

Monday, April 28
Draw 20
8:00

Draw 22
14:30

Draw 24
21:00

Tuesday, April 29
Draw 25
8:00

Draw 26
11:15

Group C

Thursday, April 24
Draw 1
8:15

Draw 2
12:00

Draw 3
15:45

Friday, April 25
Draw 5
8:00

Draw 6
11:15

Draw 7
14:30

Draw 9
21:00

Saturday, April 26
Draw 10
8:00

Draw 12
14:30

Draw 13
17:45

Draw 14
21:00

Sunday, April 27
Draw 15
8:00

Draw 16
11:15

Draw 17
14:30

Draw 18
17:45

Monday, April 28
Draw 20
8:00

Draw 21
11:15

Draw 23
17:45

Draw 24
21:00

Group D

Thursday, April 24
Draw 3
15:45

Draw 4
19:30

Friday, April 25
Draw 7
14:30

Draw 8
17:45

Saturday, April 26
Draw 10
8:00

Draw 11
11:15

Draw 13
17:45

Sunday, April 27
Draw 16
11:15

Draw 17
14:30

Draw 18
17:45

Draw 19
21:00

Monday, April 28
Draw 21
11:15

Draw 23
17:45

Draw 24
21:00

Playoffs

Round of 16
Tuesday, April 29, 15:30

Quarterfinals
Tuesday, April 29, 20:00

Semifinals
Wednesday, April 30, 10:15

Bronze medal game
Wednesday, April 30, 15:30

Gold medal game
Wednesday, April 30, 15:30

References

External links

World Mixed Doubles Curling Championship
World Mixed Doubles Championship
World Mixed Doubles Curling Championship
World Mixed Doubles Curling Championship
Sport in Dumfries
International curling competitions hosted by Scotland